Lindey's Landing West Seaplane Base  is a privately owned, public-use seaplane base located one nautical mile (2 km) northwest of the central business district of Seeley Lake, a community in Missoula County, Montana, United States.

Facilities and aircraft 
Lindey's Landing West Seaplane Base has one seaplane landing area designated 12/30 which measures 14,000 x 1,000 feet (4,267 x 305 m). For the 12-month period ending August 24, 2005, the airport had 230 aircraft operations: 70% general aviation and 30% military.

References

External links 

Airports in Montana
Seaplane bases in the United States
Buildings and structures in Missoula County, Montana
Transportation in Missoula County, Montana